James Spaight may refer to:
 James Spaight (sport shooter), British sport shooter
 Sir James Spaight (MP), Irish politician